Kitutu Chache North is a constituency in Kenya. It is one of nine constituencies in Kisii County.

Marani Sub-county
Marani Sub-county shares common boundaries with Kitutu Chache North Constituency. The Sub-county is headed by the sub-county administrator, appointed by a County Public Service Board.

References 

Constituencies in Kisii County